Serhiy Ilin is a Ukrainian football player.

Career
Serhiy Ilin is a pupil of the football school Bukovyna Chernivtsi. He made his first steps at a professional debut in FC Shakhtar-3 Donetsk for the third and second teams. During the season 2006-2008 for the brace of Kryvbas Kryvyi Rih and Zorya Luhansk, where in total he played 42 matches and scored 6 goals. In 2009 he played in the amateur team of FC Luzhany.

He spent most of his career in various clubs of the first and second leagues of Ukrainian football. In particular, in such clubs as Bukovyna Chernivtsi, Nyva Ternopil, Desna Chernihiv, Helios Kharkiv and FC "Poltava". He also spent part of his career in the top leagues of Moldova and Latvia, in such clubs as Sheriff Tiraspol and Jelgava.

For the first time playing in the amateur team "Hutsulshchina" (Kosov). Since 2015, he has repeatedly become the winner of various regional competitions. In the summer of 2018, he became the owner of the regional Cup, and in November - the owner of the Super Cup as part of FC Korovia. He is also works as a trainer at the Bukovina Children's and Youth Sports School.

Personal life
He is married and has a daughter, Anastasia.

References

External links 
 Serhiy Ilin footballfacts.ru
 Serhiy Ilin allplayers.in.ua
 

1987 births
Living people
FC Desna Chernihiv players
FC Helios Kharkiv players
FC Bukovyna Chernivtsi players
FC Nyva Ternopil players
FK Jelgava players
Ukrainian footballers
Ukrainian Premier League players
Ukrainian First League players
Ukrainian Second League players
Latvian Higher League players
Ukrainian expatriate sportspeople in Latvia
Expatriate footballers in Latvia
Association football midfielders
Sportspeople from Chernivtsi